Amadou Diawara (born 17 July 1997) is a Guinean professional footballer who plays as a midfielder for Belgian First Division A club Anderlecht and the Guinea national team.

Club career

Early career
Amadou Diawara was born in Conakry in Guinea.
Diawara joined Lega Pro side San Marino in 2014.

Bologna
While playing for San Marino, Bologna Director of football Pantaleo Corvino spotted his talents and brought him to Bologna in a deal costing the side £420,000 in July 2015. On 22 August 2015, Diawara made his Serie A debut for Bologna, in an away match against Lazio, coming on as an 84th-minute substitute for Lorenzo Crisetig.

Napoli
On 26 August 2016, Diawara signed for fellow Serie A club Napoli .
On 17 October 2017, Diawara scored his first senior goal for Napoli from the penalty spot against Manchester City in the Champions League. On 8 April 2018, he scored his first Serie A goal and second senior goal for Napoli against Chievo Verona.

Roma
On 1 July 2019, Diawara signed a deal with Roma until 2024.

Anderlecht
On 31 August 2022, Diawara moved to Anderlecht on a three-year contract.

International career
Diawara was born in Guinea, but played football in Italy since 2014, and received Italian citizenship. The Azzurri trainer Giampiero Ventura was trying to recruit him in 2018. However, he pledged his international allegiance to the Guinea national football team in March 2018, and he received a call-up to the national team in October 2018. Diawara debuted for Guinea in a 2–0 2019 Africa Cup of Nations qualification win over Rwanda national football team on 12 October 2018.

Career statistics

Club

International

Honours 
Roma
 UEFA Europa Conference League: 2021–22

References

1997 births
Living people
Sportspeople from Conakry
Guinean footballers
Guinea international footballers
Association football midfielders
Serie A players
Bologna F.C. 1909 players
A.S.D. Victor San Marino players
S.S.C. Napoli players
A.S. Roma players
R.S.C. Anderlecht players
Guinean expatriate footballers
Guinean expatriate sportspeople in Italy
Expatriate footballers in Italy
Guinean expatriate sportspeople in Belgium
Expatriate footballers in Belgium
2019 Africa Cup of Nations players
2021 Africa Cup of Nations players
UEFA Europa Conference League winning players